All of a Sudden was singer-songwriter John Hiatt's fifth album, released in 1982. It was his first of three albums with Geffen Records.

Track listing
All tracks written by John Hiatt, except where noted

"I Look for Love" – 3:34
"This Secret Life" – 3:58
"Overnight Story" – 3:30
"Forever Yours" – 3:48
"Some Fun Now" – 3:21
"The Walking Dead" – 2:54
"I Could Use an Angel" – 3:38
"Getting Excited" – 3:36
"Doll Hospital" – 3:03 (Hiatt, Isabella Wood)
"Something Happens" – 3:24
"Marianne" – 2:46
"My Edge of the Razor" – 4:21

Personnel
John Hiatt – guitar, vocals
Jesse Harms – keyboards, backing vocals
James Rolleston – bass guitar, backing vocals
Darrell Verdusco – drums, backing vocals
Technical
Larry Alexander – engineer
Nick Taggart – cover illustration
Richard Seireeni – art direction
Howard Rosenberg – photography

Notes 

1982 albums
John Hiatt albums
Albums produced by Tony Visconti
Geffen Records albums